Ryan Letourneau (born November 28, 1988) is a Canadian Twitch streamer and YouTuber. Letourneau streams full-time on Twitch and uploads parts of his streams to YouTube while also creating content exclusively to upload to YouTube.

Career

YouTube 
Letourneau created his YouTube channel "Northernlion" on May 30, 2006. In 2011 he began regularly posting content to YouTube full-time, mainly consisting of Let's Play videos of various indie games. In 2011, Letourneau began uploading gaming videos of The Binding of Isaac, which became one of his most popular Let's Play series and helped garner him an online following. Alongside other Let's Play videos, Letourneau's videos of The Binding of Isaac were credited with bringing the game popularity; game creator Edmund McMillen stated that Let's Play videos boosted sales of the game. In 2013, Letourneau interviewed McMillen about The Binding of Isaac, where he stated that the popularity of the game convinced him to make Rebirth. One year later, he attended the Game Developers Conference to discuss the impact of Let's Play videos on the sales of various video games, also referencing how the popularity of his Binding of Isaac videos led to increased exposure of the game.

Letourneau has also been credited for popularizing other video games with his gaming videos, such as Enter the Gungeon, Slay the Spire and Monster Train. Bob McCann of TechRadar described Letourneau as "[managing] to be both informative and talk through his tactical choices during games, which many viewers find useful." Jonathan Lee of Yahoo! News has also noted Letourneau for his "quick wit."

Twitch 
Letourneau created his Twitch channel "Northernlion" on August 5, 2010. On February 25, 2013, Letourneau uploaded the first "Northernlion Live Super Show" (NLSS), a three hour stream in which he and his co-hosts would play a variety of videogames, usually divided into three one hour long segments. He alongside other members of the show were included in the indie game Spelunky as an easter egg. The final episode of the NLSS aired on January 21, 2021.

In 2016 Letourneau participated in an esports tournament sponsored by Amazon where he competed against Twitch streamer Adam "B0aty" Lyne in Pac-Man 256 where he won the match. In 2020, Letourneau was invited to stream the video game Among Us with United States congresswoman Alexandria Ocasio-Cortez and Canadian member of Parliament Jagmeet Singh; the stream also featured internet personalities Hasan Piker, ContraPoints, Corpse Husband, Sykkuno and xQc. In 2022, Letourneau received a nomination in the 2022 Streamer Awards for the category of the "Best Strategy Game Streamer."

Personal life 
Letourneau was born on November 28, 1988 and grew up in Kingston, Ontario, Canada. Letourneau married Kate Letourneau in May 2014. On September 29, 2020 their daughter Luna Letourneau was born.

References 

1988 births
Living people
Canadian YouTubers
Gaming YouTubers
Let's Players
Twitch (service) streamers
Video game commentators